The 2022–23 South of Scotland Football League is the 77th season of the South of Scotland Football League, and the 9th season as part of the sixth tier of the Scottish football pyramid system. The season started on 30 July 2022, and St Cuthbert Wanderers are the reigning champions.

Teams

The following team changed divisions after the 2021–22 season.

From South of Scotland League
Transferred to West of Scotland Football League

 Threave Rovers

 Club with an SFA licence eligible to participate in the Lowland League promotion play-off should they win the league.

Caledonian Braves reserves and Stranraer reserves are ineligible for promotion.

League table

Results

References

External links

South of Scotland Football League
SCO
6
Sco6